Amine Guennichi (born 16 March 1999) is a Tunisian Greco-Roman wrestler. He represented Tunisia at the 2019 African Games held in Rabat, Morocco and he won the silver medal in the 130 kg event. He is also a five-time medalist at the African Wrestling Championships.

Career 

He qualified at the 2021 African & Oceania Wrestling Olympic Qualification Tournament to represent Tunisia at the 2020 Summer Olympics in Tokyo, Japan. He competed in the men's 130 kg event.

In November 2021, he competed in the 130 kg event at the U23 World Wrestling Championships held in Belgrade, Serbia.

He won the silver medal in his event at the 2022 African Wrestling Championships held in El Jadida, Morocco. He won the bronze medal in the 130 kg event at the 2022 Mediterranean Games held in Oran, Algeria.

Achievements

References

External links 
 

Living people
1999 births
Place of birth missing (living people)
Tunisian male sport wrestlers
African Games silver medalists for Tunisia
African Games medalists in wrestling
Competitors at the 2019 African Games
African Wrestling Championships medalists
Wrestlers at the 2020 Summer Olympics
Olympic wrestlers of Tunisia
Competitors at the 2022 Mediterranean Games
Mediterranean Games bronze medalists for Tunisia
Mediterranean Games medalists in wrestling
21st-century Tunisian people